Rarities, B-Sides & Other Stuff is a 1996 album by Sarah McLachlan.

It is a compilation of tracks that McLachlan recorded for film soundtracks, remixes of her own songs, covers of songs by other artists, and material that she recorded in collaboration with various artists.

Guest musicians appearing on the album include Deni Bonet, Jocelyne Lanois, Bill Dillon, Luke Doucet, Manufacture and Camille Henderson; remixers include Anthony Valcic, Gary Stokes and Rabbit in the Moon.

The song "Full of Grace" later reappeared as the ninth track on McLachlan's next album, Surfacing. The extended remix of "Vox" first appeared on the 1989 release of her debut album, Touch.

Track listing

Charts

Weekly charts

Year-end charts

Certifications and sales

See also
Rarities, B-Sides and Other Stuff Volume 2

References

B-side compilation albums
1996 compilation albums
Nettwerk Records compilation albums
Sarah McLachlan compilation albums
Albums produced by Pierre Marchand